The Annie Cordy Tunnel (formerly Leopold II Tunnel) is a traffic tunnel in Brussels. The tunnel, under the Boulevard Léopold II, connects the Rogier Tunnel and the Small Ring with the Basilica Tunnel and the A10/E40 via Keizer Karellaan. The tunnel is an important arterial road for traffic leaving or entering Brussels. It is the western approach road for Brussels. With a length of 2,534 meters it is also the longest road tunnel in Belgium.

In 2012, the Brussels-Capital Region started a procedure to renew this tunnel through public-private partnership in the 2014-2018 period and to outsource its maintenance for 25 years. The works were budgeted at 105 million euros. In 2016, the tunnel was closed several times due to falling debris.

In September 2020, the Brussels government decided to consult the population about a new name for the tunnel in an effort to increase the number of female named streets in the city.

In March 2021, the results of the public referendum for a new female namesake for the tunnel were announced. It was decided to change the name to Annie Cordy Tunnel after planned renovations were completed. The tunnel is named after the singer Annie Cordy.

References 

Buildings and structures in Brussels
Name changes due to the George Floyd protests
Road tunnels in Belgium
Transport in Brussels
Tunnels completed in 1986